Anett Kontaveit was the defending champion, but lost in the first round to Veronika Kudermetova.

Aleksandra Krunić won her first WTA singles title, defeating Kirsten Flipkens in the final, 6–7(0–7), 7–5, 6–1.

Seeds

Draw

Finals

Top half

Bottom half

Qualifying

Seeds

Qualifiers

Lucky loser

Qualifying draw

First qualifier

Second qualifier

Third qualifier

Fourth qualifier

Fifth qualifier

Sixth qualifier

References
 Main Draw
 Qualifying Draw

Libéma Open - Singles
2018 Women's Singles